The Supreme Director of Chile was the head of state and government of Chile following the independence from Spain in 1810, until 1826. Several juntas also ruled the country during this period.

List
Political parties

See also
President of Chile

References 

 
1810 establishments in the Captaincy General of Chile
1820s disestablishments in Chile